Kitchen. The Last Battle is a Russian comedy film directed by Anton Fedotov. It stars Dmitry Nazarov and Dmitry Nagiev. The premiere of the film in Russia was on 20 April 2017.

Plot 
Viktor Barinov  and his team are sent to the world championship among cooks at the request of the President of Russia. He will have to help his son, whom Victor will find out on the eve of the championship.

Cast
 Dmitry Nazarov as Viktor Barinov
 Dmitry Nagiev as Dmitriy Nagiev
 Sergey Lavygin as Arseniy Chuganin
 Mikhail Tarabukin as Fyodor Yurchenko
 Anfisa Chernykh as Anna
 Kirill Kovbas as Ivan
 Sergey Epishev as Lev Solovyov
 Nikita Tarasov as Louis Benoit
 Mikhail Bashkatov as Denis Krylov
 Marina Mogilevskaya as Yelena Sokolova
 Valeriya Fedorovich as Yekaterina Semyonova
 Oleg Tabakov as Pyotr Barinov
 Grigoriy Siyatvinda as Mikhail Dzhekovich
 Alexander Andrievich as Elen Ducasse
 Diana Pozharskaya as Dasha
 Olga Kuzmina as Nastya
 Igor Ivanov 	
 Olga Vasileva 		
 Valeriy Afanasev as Hotel Guest

References

External links 
 

Russian adventure comedy films
2010s Russian-language films
2017 films
Cooking films